Eugenia polypora is a species of plant in the family Myrtaceae. It is endemic to Jamaica.

References

polypora
Critically endangered plants
Endemic flora of Jamaica
Taxonomy articles created by Polbot